A horseshoe is a fabricated product which is designed to protect a horse hoof from wear. Shoes are attached on the palmar surface (ground side) of the hooves, usually nailed through the insensitive hoof wall that is anatomically akin to the human toenail, although much larger and thicker. However there are also cases where shoes are glued.

Horseshoes are available in a wide variety of materials and styles, developed for different types of horses and to enable them to work. The most common materials are steel and aluminium, but specialized shoes may include use of rubber, plastic, magnesium, titanium, or copper. Steel tends to be preferred in sports in which a strong, long-wearing shoe is needed, such as polo, eventing, show jumping, and western riding events. Aluminium shoes are lighter, making them common in horse racing where a lighter shoe is desired, and often facilitate certain types of movement; they are often favored in the discipline of dressage. Some horseshoes have "caulkins", "caulks", or "calks": protrusions at the toe or heels of the shoe, or both, to provide additional traction.

The fitting of horseshoes is a professional occupation, conducted by a farrier, who specializes in the preparation of feet, assessing potential lameness issues, and fitting appropriate shoes, including remedial features where required. In countries including the United Kingdom  horseshoeing is legally restricted to people with specific qualifications and experience. In others including the United States, where professional licensing is not legally required, professional organizations provide certification programs which publicly identify qualified individuals who are farriers.

When kept as a talisman, a horseshoe is said to bring good luck. A stylized variation of the horseshoe is used for a popular throwing game, horseshoes.

History

Since the early history of domestication of the horse, working animals were found to be exposed to many conditions that created breakage or excessive hoof wear. Ancient people recognized the need for the walls (and sometimes the sole) of domestic horses' hooves to have additional protection over and above any natural hardness. An early form of hoof protection was seen in ancient Asia, where horses' hooves were wrapped in rawhide, leather, or other materials for both therapeutic purposes and protection from wear. From archaeological finds in Great Britain, the Romans appeared to have attempted to protect their horses' feet with a strap-on, solid-bottomed "hipposandal" that has a slight resemblance to the modern hoof boot.

Historians differ on the origin of the horseshoe. Because iron was a valuable commodity and any worn out items were generally reforged and reused, it is difficult to locate clear archaeological evidence. Although some credit the Druids, there is no hard evidence to support the claim. In 1897 four bronze horseshoes with what are apparently nail holes were found in an Etruscan tomb dated around 400 BC. The assertion by some historians that the Romans invented the "mule shoes" sometime after 100 BC is supported by a reference by Catullus who died in 54 BC. However, these references to use of horseshoes and muleshoes in Rome may have been to the "hipposandal"—leather boots, reinforced by an iron plate, rather than to nailed horseshoes.

Existing references to the nailed shoe are relatively late, first known to have appeared around AD 900, but there may have been earlier uses given that some have been found in layers of dirt. There are no extant references to nailed horseshoes prior to the reign of Byzantine Emperor Leo VI, and by 973 occasional references to them can be found. The earliest clear written record of iron horseshoes is a reference to "crescent figured irons and their nails" in AD 910. There is very little evidence of any sort that suggests the existence of nailed-on shoes prior to AD 500 or 600, though there is a find dated to the fifth century AD of a horseshoe, complete with nails, found in the tomb of the Frankish King Childeric I at Tournai, Belgium.

Around 1000 AD, cast bronze horseshoes with nail holes became common in Europe. A design with a scalloped outer rim and six nail holes was common. According to Gordon Ward the scalloped edges were created by double punching the nail holes causing the edges to bulge. The 13th and 14th centuries brought the widespread manufacturing of iron horseshoes. By the time of the Crusades (1096–1270), horseshoes were widespread and frequently mentioned in various written sources. In that era due to the value of iron, horseshoes were even accepted in lieu of coin to pay taxes.

By the 13th century, shoes were forged in large quantities and could be bought ready made. Hot shoeing, the process of shaping a heated horseshoe immediately before placing it on the horse, became common in the 16th century. From the need for horseshoes, the craft of blacksmithing became "one of the great staple crafts of medieval and modern times and contributed to the development of metallurgy." A treatise titled "No Foot, No Horse" was published in England in 1751.

In 1835, the first U.S. patent for a horseshoe manufacturing machine capable of making up to 60 horseshoes per hour was issued to Henry Burden. In mid-19th-century Canada, marsh horseshoes kept horses from sinking into the soft intertidal mud during dike-building. In a common design, a metal horseshoe holds a flat wooden shoe in place.

China
In China, iron horseshoes became common during the Yuan dynasty (1271–1368), prior to which rattan and leather shoes were used to preserve animal hooves. Evidence of the preservation of horse hooves in China dates to the Warring States period (476–221 BC), during which Zhuangzi recommended shaving horse hooves to keep them in good shape. The Discourses on Salt and Iron in 81 BC mentions using leather shoes, but it is not clear if they were used for protecting horse hooves or to aid in mounting the horse. Remnants of iron horseshoes have been found in what is now northeast China, but the tombs date to the Goguryeo period in 414 AD. A mural in the Mogao Caves dated to 584 AD depicts a man caring for a horse's hoof, which some speculate might be depicting horseshoe nailing, but the mural is too eroded to tell clearly.

The earliest reference to iron horseshoes in China dates to 938 AD during the Five Dynasties and Ten Kingdoms period. A monk named Gao Juhui sent to the Western Regions writes that the people in Ganzhou (now Zhangye) taught him how to make "horse hoof muse", which had four holes in it that connected to four holes in the horse's hoof, and were thus put together. They also recommended using yak skin shoes for camel hooves. Iron horseshoes however did not become common for another three centuries. Zhao Rukuo writes in Zhu Fan Zhi, finished in 1225, that the horses of the Arabs and Persians used metal for horse shoes, implying that horses in China did not. After the establishment of the Yuan dynasty in 1271 AD, iron horseshoes became more common in northern China. When Thomas Blakiston travelled up the Yangtze, he noted that in Sichuan "cattle wore straw shoes to prevent their slipping on the wet ground" while in northern China, "horses and cattle are shod with iron shoes and nails." The majority of Chinese horseshoe discoveries have been in Jilin, Heilongjiang, Liaoning, Sichuan, and Tibet.

Reasons for use

Environmental changes linked to domestication

Many changes brought about by the domestication of the horse have led to a need for shoes for numerous reasons. It is mostly linked to management which results in horses' hooves hardening less and being more vulnerable to injury. While horses in the wild cover large areas of terrain, they usually do so at relatively slow speeds, unless being chased by a predator. They also tend to live in arid steppe climates. The consequence of slow but nonstop travel in a dry climate is that horses' feet are naturally worn to a small, smooth, even, and hard state. The continual stimulation of the sole of the foot keeps it thick and hard. However in domestication, the manner in which horses are used differs from what they would encounter in their natural environment. Domesticated horses are brought to colder and wetter areas than their ancestral habitat. These softer and heavier soils soften the hooves and make them prone to splitting, making hoof protection necessary. Consequently it was in northern Europe that the nailed horseshoe arose in its modern form .

Physical stresses requiring horseshoes
Abnormal stress: Horses' hooves can become quite worn out when subjected to the added weight and stress of a rider, pack load, cart, or wagon.

Corrective shoeing: The shape, weight, and thickness of a horseshoe can significantly affect the horse's gait. Farriers may forge custom shoes to help horses with bone or musculature problems in their legs, or fit commercially available remedial shoes.
Traction: Traction devices such as borium for ice, horse shoe studs for muddy or slick conditions, calks, carbide-tipped road nails and rims are useful for performance horses such as eventers, show jumpers, polo ponies, and other horses that perform at high speeds, over changing terrain, or in less-than-ideal footing.

Gait manipulation: Some breeds such as the Saddlebred, Tennessee Walking Horse, and other gaited horses are judged on their high-stepping movement. Special shoeing can help enhance their natural movement.
 Racing horses with weakness in their foot or leg require specialized horseshoes.

Horseshoeing theories and debates

Domestic horses do not always require shoes. When possible, a "barefoot" hoof, at least for part of every year, is a healthy option for most horses. However, horseshoes have their place and can help prevent excess or abnormal hoof wear and injury to the foot. Many horses go without shoes year round, some using temporary protection such as hoof boots for short-term use.

Process of shoeing

Shoeing, when performed correctly, causes no pain to the animal. Farriers trim the insensitive part of the hoof, which is the same area into which they drive the nails. This is analogous to a manicure on a human fingernail, only on a much larger scale.

Before beginning to shoe, the farrier removes the old shoe using pincers (shoe pullers) and trims the hoof wall to the desired length with nippers, a sharp pliers-like tool, and the sole and frog of the hoof with a hoof knife. Shoes do not allow the hoof to wear down as it naturally would in the wild, and it can then become too long. The coffin bone inside the hoof should line up straight with both bones in the pastern. If the excess hoof is not trimmed, the bones will become misaligned, which would place stress on the legs of the animal.

Shoes are then measured to the foot and bent to the correct shape using a hammer, anvil, forge,  and other modifications, such as taps for shoe studs, are added. Farriers may either cold shoe, in which they bend the metal shoe without heating it, or hot shoe, in which they place the metal in a forge before bending it. Hot shoeing can be more time consuming, and requires the farrier to have access to a forge; however, it usually provides a better fit, as the mark made on the hoof from the hot shoe can show how even it lies. It also allows the farrier to make more modifications to the shoe, such as drawing toe- and quarter-clips. The farrier must take care not to hold the hot shoe against the hoof for too long, as the heat can damage the hoof.

Hot shoes are placed in water to cool them. The farrier then nails the shoes on by driving the nails into the hoof wall at the white line of the hoof. The nails are shaped in such a way that they bend outward as they are driven in, avoiding the sensitive inner part of the foot, so they emerge on the sides of the hoof. When the nail has been completely driven, the farrier cuts off the sharp points and uses a clincher (a form of tongs made especially for this purpose) or a clinching block with hammer to bend the rest of the nail so it is almost flush with the hoof wall. It prevents the nail from getting caught on anything, and also helps to hold the nail, and therefore the shoe, in place.

The farrier then uses a rasp (large file), to smooth the edge where it meets the shoe and eliminate any sharp edges left from cutting off the nails.

In culture

Superstition

Horseshoes have long been considered lucky. They were originally made of iron, a material that was believed to ward off evil spirits, and traditionally were held in place with seven nails, seven being the luckiest number. The superstition acquired a further Christian twist due to a legend surrounding the tenth-century saint Dunstan, who worked as a blacksmith before becoming Archbishop of Canterbury. The legend recounts that, one day, the Devil walked into Dunstan's shop and asked him to shoe his horse. Dunstan pretended not to recognize him, and agreed to the request; but rather than nailing the shoe to the horse's hoof, he nailed it to the Devil's own foot, causing him great pain. Dunstan eventually agreed to remove the shoe, but only after extracting a promise that the Devil would never enter a household with a horseshoe nailed to the door.

Opinions are divided as to which way up the horseshoe ought to be nailed for display. Some say the ends should point up, so that the horseshoe catches the luck, and that the ends pointing down allow the good luck to be lost; others say they should point down, so that the luck is poured upon those entering the home.
Superstitious sailors believe that nailing a horseshoe to the mast will help their vessel avoid storms.

Heraldry
In heraldry horseshoes most often occur as canting charges, such as in the arms of families with names like Farrier, Marshall, and Smith. A horseshoe with two hammers also appears in the arms of Hammersmith and Fulham, a borough in London.

The flag of Rutland, England's smallest historic county, consists of a golden horseshoe laid over a field scattered with acorns. It refers to an ancient tradition in which every noble visiting Oakham, Rutland's county town, presents a horseshoe to the Lord of the Manor, which is then nailed to the wall of Oakham Castle. Over centuries the Castle has amassed a vast collection of horseshoes, the oldest of which date from the 15th century.

Monuments and structures
A massive golden horseshoe structure is erected over the shopping mall of the Tuuri village in Alavus, a town of Finland. It is one of the most famous monuments in the locality; however it ranks number three in Reuters' list of world's ugliest buildings and monuments.

Sport

The sport of horseshoes involves a horseshoe being thrown to land as close as possible to a rod in order to score points. As far as is known, the sport is as old as horseshoes themselves. While traditional horseshoes can still be used, most organized versions of the game use specialized sporting horseshoes, which do not fit on horses' hooves.

See also
Farrier
Horse care
Horse hoof
Laminitis
Natural hoof care

References

External links

Historical development of the horseshoe 1891 Scientific American article from Project Gutenberg
The True Legend of St. Dunstan and the Devil by Edward G. Flight, illustrated by George Cruikshank, published in 1871, and available from Project Gutenberg
Mair and Dicken collections of historical horseshoes in the Museum of English Rural Life

Equine hoof
 
Heraldic charges
Lucky symbols
Farriery
Objects believed to protect from evil
Talismans